Yoo Su-bin (born 6 November 1992) is a South Korean actor.

Career 
Yoo made his drama debut in Prison Playbook in 2017, as Yang Jung Suk, who was involved in the back story of Jung Hae In's character.

Prison Playbook is directed by the Shin Won Ho, who is also behind Reply 1988.

In 2019, he had a major supporting role in the short film The Present. However, it was his role as a North Korean soldier obsessed with South Korean dramas in the dramas Crash Landing on You that made a surprising impact. Besides his amusing characterization, he also received strong praise from North Korean defectors who are impressed with his accent.

Personal life 
Yoo is the younger brother of director Yoo Soo-min, who directed Weak Hero Class 1, and Yoo also made a cameo appearance for his older brother.

Filmography

Film

Television series

Web series

Television show

References

External links 
  (in Korean)
 
 

1992 births
Living people
People from Bucheon
South Korean male film actors
South Korean male television actors
21st-century South Korean male actors